The 1960–61 FAW Welsh Cup is the 74th season of the annual knockout tournament for competitive football teams in Wales. The final was played at Ninian Park in Cardiff, in front of an attendance of 5,938.

First round

Second round

Third round

Fourth round

Fifth round

Sixth round

Semi-finals

Replay

Final

References
General
1960-61 Welsh Cup at fchd.info
1960-61 Welsh Cup at rsssf.com
1960-61 Welsh Cup at wfda.co.uk

Specific

External links

The FAW Welsh Cup at low.org.uk

1960-61
Wales
Cup